Yendi Senior High School (YESS) is coeducational secondary school at Yendi in the Northern Region of Ghana. The school was established in 1970, first as middle boarding school to enable access to basic education for communities in the Eastern Corridor enclave before it was upgraded in September same year to the status of a secondary school. For the first academic year, the school had  only 77 total student population with 70 boys and seven girls. The first headmaster of the school was Cletus Bernard Teviu. He headed the school for nearly a decade spanning between 1970 and 1979 and one of the hostels in the school has been named in his honour. In the year 2020 when the school celebrated its 50 years anniversary, total student population was 2,724 and number of teachers were 121. The school operates as a boarding school but few attend as day students.

History
As of 2016, the school had a girls' dormitory with 500 students.

In 2018, Alhaji Faruok Aliu Mahama donated GHc 10,000.00 to the school for a water project.

The Jubilee Park at the school was used in January 2019 for part of the coronation process for Yaa Naa Abubakari Mahama as king of Dagbon.

References

Schools in Ghana
Schools in Northern Region (Ghana)